The 1919 Giro d'Italia was the seventh edition of the Giro d'Italia, one of cycling's Grand Tours. The field consisted of 63 riders, and 15 riders finished the race.

References

1919 Giro d'Italia
1919